Did I Tell You may refer to:

"Did I Tell You" (The Jerry Williams song), 1989
"Did I Tell You" (The Spinto Band song), 2005